Amafa aKwaZulu-Natali (Zulu for 'Heritage KwaZulu-Natal'), commonly known as 'Amafa', is a provincial heritage resources authority in terms of South Africa's National Heritage Resources Act. It was established in 1997 in terms of the KwaZulu-Natal Heritage Act of that year and is an agency of the Office of the Premier of the government of the KwaZulu-Natal Province of South Africa. It is also a 'public entity' under the terms of the Public Finance Management Act. It is mandated to care for that part of South Africa's national estate that is of provincial and local significance in KwaZulu-Natal .

Amafa is the oldest heritage resources authority in South Africa, all others being established in terms of the National Heritage Resources Act of 1999 or, in the Northern Cape, under provincial legislation that post dates the KwaZulu-Natal Heritage Act of 1997.

Amafa is best known as the custodian of approximately 300 provincial landmarks and heritage landmarks in the province, and several sites at which it manages interpretative centres.

History 
Amafa is the successor body to the National Monuments Council in the former Natal Province and KwaZulu Monuments Council in the former KwaZulu Bantustan or homeland, in South Africa. Under the 1996 Constitution of South Africa, cultural matters are a competency shared between national and provincial government. This necessitated the creation of a system whereby many of the responsibilities of former monuments authorities were devolved to provincial level via the National Heritage Resources Act.

Provinces may pass their own heritage resources legislation and KwaZulu-Natal is one of only two that has chosen that route rather than to use provisions of the National Heritage Resources Act to establish a provincial heritage resources authority (PHRA). Part of the reason for this is that the first KwaZulu-Natal Heritage Act (1997) predates the National Heritage Resources Act (1999) and that there was no national framework for heritage at the time that the province resolved to establish its PHRA. The 1997 Act was replaced in 2008 by a new act of the same name.

The logo of the organisation is the one formerly used by the KwaZulu Monuments Council.

Chairpersons of council 
 1997 – 2013: Mr Arthur Konigkramer
 2013–Present Mr. J. Sithole

Chief executive officers 
 1997 – 2013: Mr Barry Marshall

SAHRA and Amafa's mandate 
Amafa is subject to a biennial assessment of competency by the South African Heritage Resources Agency, SAHRA in terms of the National Heritage Resources Act. This process determines which aspects of the national estate it is qualified to implement. It has been assessed as competent to deal with all areas over which a provincial heritage resources authority is permitted to act.

Heritage resources for which Amafa is responsible 
In terms of the KwaZulu-Natal Heritage Act Amafa is responsible for a range of heritage resources.

Specially protected sites 
Amafa inherited responsibility for former national monuments and KwaZulu monuments in the province. These are now known as 'specially protected heritage resources' and are provincial landmarks, if state-owned, or heritage landmarks, if privately owned. These terms equate with the term provincial heritage site used by the National Heritage Resources Act and hence all other provincial heritage resources authorities in South Africa. At present there are around 300 such sites in the province .

Most specially protected sites must be declared by publication of a notice in the Provincial Gazette, but graves of members of the Zulu royal family, and battlefields and public monuments and memorials listed in the Schedule to the KwaZulu-Natal Heritage Act are automatically protected in the same way as a Heritage Landmark.

The organisation continues to declare new sites on a regular basis.

General protections
The following are protected without the need to be specifically identified and declared in terms of the Act.
 Structures older than 60 years
 Graves of victims of conflict
 Traditional burial places
 Battlefields
 Archaeological sites
 Palaeontological sites
 Rock art sites
 Historic fortifications
 Meteorites and meteorite impact sites

Heritage objects
Amafa may also protect moveable heritage as Heritage Objects by publication of a notice in the Provincial Gazette

Museums and interpretation centres 
Amafa is unique amongst provincial heritage resources authorities in South Africa in that it also runs a museum and several interpretive centres at sites which it manages: .
KwaZulu Cultural Museum, Ondini, Ulundi.  The museum is the former museum of the KwaZulu Bantustan and illustrates the culture of the Zulu people. Ondini also includes the site of the capital of the Zulu King Cetshwayo kaMpande.
 Mgungundlovu, the site of the capital of Zulu King Dingane kaSenzangakhona.
 KwaDukuza, site of the assassination of Zulu King Shaka.
 Isandlwana Battlefield
 Rorkes Drift – Shiyane Battlefield
 Spioenkop Battlefield
 Border Cave Rock Shelter Stone Age site
 Kamberg Rock Art Centre

Council and committees 
Amafa is governed by a council appointed by members of the executive council of the province responsible for its functions. Presently that is the provincial Premier. It is appointed for a three-year term of office. .

The council has established a number of committees which meet regularly to implement the responsibilities of the organisation. These include the following: .

 Executive
 Human resources
 Museum
 Built environment
 Permit review committee for archaeology

Staff complement 
Amafa employs a staff complement of around 100.  They are under the authority of the chief executive officer.

Funding 
Amafa receives an annual transfer payment from the KwaZulu-Natal premier's department. This, together with earnings from application fees and income generated by the sites which it manages, covers its operational costs.

Offices 
Amafa has offices at the KwaZulu Cultural Museum, King Cetshwayo Highway, Ondini, Ulundi (28.19.11.33S 31.27.33.75E) and the Old YMCA Building, Cnr Langalibalele and Buchanan Streets, Pietermaritzburg (29.36.16.46S 30.22.39.42.E)

Literature 
 KwaZulu-Natal Heritage Act (Act No. 10 of 1997)
 KwaZulu-Natal Heritage Act, Act No.4 of 2008, KwaZulu-Natal Provincial Gazette 225 of 12 February 2009
 http://www.dac.gov.za/acts/a25-99.pdf
 Annual Report – 2009-2010
 National Heritage Resources Act, Act 25 of 1999, Government Notice 506, Republic of South Africa Government Gazette, Vol. 406, No 19974, Cape Town, 28 April 1999
 List of heritage sites in KwaZulu-Natal

See also
 Provincial heritage resources authority
 Provincial heritage site (South Africa)
 Heritage objects (South Africa)
 South African Heritage Resource Agency
 Heritage Western Cape
 Northern Cape Heritage Resources Authority
 National Monuments Council (South Africa and Namibia)
 Historical Monuments Commission
 List of heritage sites in KwaZulu-Natal

References

External links 
 Website of the South African Heritage Resources Agency

South African heritage resources
South African heritage sites
Heritage registers in South Africa
Monuments and memorials in South Africa
Buildings and structures in the Western Cape
Paleontological sites of Africa
Paleoanthropological sites
Archaeological sites in South Africa
Heritage organizations
History organisations based in South Africa
+